Kuper may refer to:

People
 Admiral Sir Augustus Leopold Kuper (1809–1885), British naval officer
 Adam Kuper, British anthropologist
 André Kuper (born 1960), German politician
 Hilda Kuper (1911–1992), Swazi anthropologist
 Leo Kuper (1908–1994), South African sociologist
 Peter Kuper (born 1958), U.S. comics artist
 Simon Kuper, British author and journalist
 Simon Meyer Kuper (1906–1963), South African judge
 Heinrich Küper (1888–1950), German adventurer

Places
 Kuper, Iran, a village in West Azerbaijan Province, Iran
 Kuper Island, between Vancouver Island and the coast of British Columbia